Myeik District is a district in the Tanintharyi Region of Burma (Myanmar). The district covers an area of 18,121 km2, and had a population of 693,087 at the 2014 Census.

Administrative divisions

Townships
The district contains the following townships:

Myeik Township (population 284,489; area 1,217 km2)
Kyunsu Township (population 171,753; area 3,137 km2)
Palaw Township  (population 129,992; area 2,404 km2)
Taninthayi Township (population 106,853; area 11,363 km2)

Subtownships
 Palauk Subtownship

References

 
Districts of Myanmar
Tanintharyi Region